Ivan Fichev (born 15 April 1860 in Tarnovo – 13 November 1931 in Sofia) was a Bulgarian general, Minister of Defense, military historian and academician.

Biography

Ivan Fichev was born in 1860 in Tırnova (now Tărnovo), at that time part of the Ottoman Empire. He was a grandson of the famous architect from the National Revival, Kolyu Ficheto. Fichev studied in Tarnovo, Gabrovo and in Robert College in Istanbul.

During the Russo-Turkish War (1877–1878) he participated in the Bulgarian volunteer corps and later served as translator for the temporary Russian governors in Gabrovo and Tarnovo. In 1880 he was accepted in the Military School in Sofia and graduated in 1882 with the rank of lieutenant and was assigned to serve in the 20th Varna infantry battalion. In August 1885 he was promoted to First Lieutenant.

Serbo-Bulgarian War
During the Serbo-Bulgarian War in 1885 he was a commander of 2nd Company in the 5th Danube Regiment and participated in the defense of Vidin between 12 and 16 November.

1886–1911
In January 1887 he was promoted to the rank of Captain and in 1898  graduated the Military Academy in Torino, Italy. On 1 January 1892 he was promoted a Major and on 1 January 1903 - a Colonel. From the beginning of 1907 he was appointed a commander of the Second Thracian Infantry Division based in Plovdiv and on 1 January 1908 Ivan Fichev was promoted a Major General. From 1910 to 1914 he was the Chief of the General Staff of the Bulgarian Army, which includes the time during the two Balkan Wars, and as such was responsible for devising the general plan for the war against the Ottoman Empire.

Balkan Wars
During the First Balkan War (1912–1913) he was the head of the operations in Thrace and fought in the successful battles at Lozengrad and Lule Burgas but after the Bulgarian advance was repulsed at Chataldja only 20 km from the Ottoman capital he fell into disgrace. In May 1913 Fichev resigned from his post as an act of protest but his resignation was not accepted and during the Second Balkan War he remained on the post of Chief of the General Staff of the Army. He also signed the Bucharest Peace Treaty as part of the Bulgarian delegation during the negotiations.

Latter life
After the Balkan Wars he continued to serve as Chief of the General Staff of the Army. On 1 January 1914 he was promoted a Lieutenant General and two weeks later was appointed commander of the 3rd Military District. On 14 September that year  he was appointed a Minister of War and served as such until August 1915 when he went into the reserve. After the First World War he was a Minister Plenipotentiary in the Romanian capital Bucharest.

Ivan Fiched died on 13 November 1931 in Sofia.

Awards
Order of Bravery, II grade;
Order of St Alexander, II grade without swords, III grade and V grade
Order of Military Merit, I grade and III grade
 Order of Stara Planina, 1st grade with swords - awarded posthumously on 20 December 2012
French Légion d'honneur, IV grade
Italian Order of the Crown of Italy, II grade
Romanian Order of the Star of Romania, III grade
Persian Order of the Lion and the Sun, II grade

Sources

 Недев, С., Командването на българската войска през войните за национално обединение, София, 1993, Военноиздателски комплекс „Св. Георги Победоносец“
Симеон Радев:"Конференцията в Букурещ и Букурещския мир от 1913 г.
Вълков, Г., Генерал Иван Фичев. Избрани произведения, София, 1988, Военно издателство

Bulgarian generals
Bulgarian diplomats
Bulgarian people of the Russo-Turkish War (1877–1878)
People of the Serbo-Bulgarian War
Bulgarian military personnel of World War I
Bulgarian military personnel of the Balkan Wars
Members of the Bulgarian Academy of Sciences
Recipients of the Order of Bravery
Recipients of the Order of Military Merit (Bulgaria)
Officiers of the Légion d'honneur
Grand Officers of the Order of the Star of Romania
Bulgarian expatriates in Romania
People from Veliko Tarnovo
1860 births
1931 deaths
Robert College alumni
Defence ministers of Bulgaria
Chiefs of staff